Shi Xiaotian (born 6 March 1990) is a Chinese professional footballer who currently plays for Chinese Super League club Henan Songshan Longmen as a goalkeeper.

Club career
Shi joined Changsha Ginde youth team system in the early year and was promoted to first team squad in 2007. He became the second choice goalkeeper of the club and acted as back-up for China national team goalkeeper Song Zhenyu in 2008. On 3 May, he made his senior debut after Song injured in the training, in a 1–1 away draw against Qingdao Jonoon. He got further chance to play for Changsha and made 6 appearances in the 2008 league season. After Song transferred to Chengdu Blades, Shi played as the back-up for newcomer Zhang Lei in 2010. Changsha Ginde finished the bottom of the league and relegation to China League One. In February 2011, the club moved to Shenzhen as the club's name changed into Shenzhen Phoenix. Shi failed to move to his hometown club Shenyang Dongjin and finally chose to stay in the club. He became the regular starter in the beginning of the season, however, he lost his position to Wang Lüe after June. The club were bought by Chinese property developers Guangzhou R&F in the middle of the season and moved to Guangzhou and won promotion back to the Super League at the first attempt. Shi made 16 appearances in the 2011 league season.

On 7 February 2014, Shi transferred to Chinese Super League side Liaoning Whowin. On 9 February 2015, he was loaned to Super League club Beijing Guoan. Shi returned to Liaoning in the 2016 season and became the first choice goalkeeper of the club after Zhang Lu left for Tianjin Quanjian.

In February 2019, Shi transferred to newly-relegated China League One side Changchun Yatai. He was ever-present in all 45 league games in the first 2 seasons, helping Yatai win the 2020 China League One and achieved promotion to the Chinese Super League.

During the 2022 winter transfer window, Shi experienced dramatic transfer sagas which saw him join 3 clubs. He first joined Shanghai Shenhua alongside former Shandong Taishan defender Li Songyi in April 2022, however Shenhua received a transfer ban afterwards before their registration procedures could be completed. He subsequently joined Chongqing Liangjiang Athletic on 29 April 2022, and was included in their squad for the 2022 Chinese Super League season. However, Chongqing announced disbandment and exit from the Chinese Super League due to financial difficulties on 24 May 2022, 10 day before the new season begins. Shi eventually joined Henan Songshan Longmen on 27 May 2022, and made his debut for the club on 20 June 2022 in a 0-0 draw against his former club Changchun Yatai.

International career
On 14 January 2017, Shi made his debut for Chinese national team in the third-place playoff of 2017 China Cup against Croatia.

Career statistics 
Statistics accurate as of match played 28 June 2022.

Honours

Club
Changchun Yatai
 China League One: 2020

References

External links
 
 

1990 births
Living people
Chinese footballers
Association football goalkeepers
Footballers from Shenyang
Changsha Ginde players
Guangzhou City F.C. players
Liaoning F.C. players
Beijing Guoan F.C. players
Changchun Yatai F.C. players
Chinese Super League players
China League One players
China international footballers